Mahlon Mitchell (born February 24, 1977) is an American firefighter and current President of the Professional Fire Fighters of Wisconsin. Assuming the office on January 12, 2011, he became the youngest and first African American president of the organization. In addition to serving as the President of the PFFW, Mitchell serves as president of the "Sable Flames," the African American firefighters of the City of Madison Fire Department.  Mitchell unsuccessfully ran in the Democratic primary for Governor of Wisconsin in 2018, placing second.

Early life and career
Mitchell was born in Milwaukee and grew up in Delavan, Wisconsin. Mitchell worked as a street outreach coordinator, linking at-risk youth with community services, and for six years as a real estate agent in the Madison area. Prior to his election as President of the Fire Fighter's Association, Mitchell served as a firefighter for more than fifteen years in Madison, Wisconsin. Mitchell has served as a counselor at the Wisconsin Alliance for Fire Safety's Burn Camp, which he also directed for five years. This summer camp worked with burn-injured youth to help them cope with their unique situation and build a network of support. Mitchell was promoted to lieutenant in the Madison Fire Department in 2010.

Mitchell worked to help pass two pieces of legislation that were seen as victories for fire fighters across the state, including the Infectious Disease Presumption Law to ensure that firefighters are covered if they contract a disease or disability on the job, and a law ensuring that families and spouses of fire fighters who die in the line of duty will have their health insurance premiums covered.

Mitchell was sought out by the national media as a critic of Wisconsin Governor Scott Walker’s collective bargaining changes, which prompted weeks of demonstrations in Madison.
 
In late October 2011, a movement to draft him to run against Walker for the office of Governor of Wisconsin surfaced on the internet. In response, Mitchell stated he would consider running in a potential recall election. On March 19, 2012, Mitchell announced his candidacy for the office of Lieutenant Governor of Wisconsin in a recall election against Rebecca Kleefisch. While victorious in the Democratic Primary, Mitchell was defeated in the June 5, 2012 election with 1,156,520 votes to Kleefisch's 1,301,739. In 2013, Mitchell received an honorary degree from the National Labor College Maritime Institute of Graduate Studies.

In 2018, Mitchell sought the Democratic nomination for Governor, and came in second in the primary to Tony Evers.

Personal life
Mitchell is married with two children and lives in Madison, Wisconsin.

Electoral history

References

External links
 Official website

 

1977 births
African-American people
American firefighters
Living people
People from Delavan, Wisconsin
Wisconsin Democrats
People from Fitchburg, Wisconsin
Mount Senario College alumni